Brett Alan Hutton (born 6 February 1993) is an English cricketer.  Hutton is a right-handed batsman who bowls right-arm medium pace. He was born at Doncaster, Yorkshire and attended Worksop College in north Nottinghamshire where he was the recipient of a cricket scholarship.

Hutton made his first-class debut for Nottinghamshire against the Marylebone Cricket Club in the Champion County match at the start of the 2011 season at the Sheikh Zayed Cricket Stadium in Abu Dhabi.  In this match, he was dismissed in Nottinghamshire's first-innings by Steve Kirby for 9 runs, while in their second-innings he was dismissed for a duck by Mohammad Nabi.  With the ball, he bowled a total of 18 wicket-less overs in the match.  Later in that season he made his List A debut against Sri Lanka A.  He scored 17 unbeaten runs in this match, while with the ball he took the wicket of Nilanka Premaratne.  He made a further List A appearance later in the season against Lancashire in the Clydesdale Bank 40. He made his Twenty20 debut on 20 May 2016 for Nottinghamshire against Birmingham Bears in the 2016 NatWest t20 Blast.

In September 2017, Hutton left Nottinghamshire to join Northamptonshire on a three-year contract in order to play more one day cricket. In June 2021, during the 2021 County Championship, Hutton took his 200th first-class wicket.

References

External links

1993 births
Living people
Cricketers from Doncaster
English cricketers
Nottinghamshire cricketers
Northamptonshire cricketers
People educated at Worksop College
English cricketers of the 21st century